Nikolay Suhorukov (born 1931) is a retired Soviet  swimmer who won a bronze medal in the 4×200 m freestyle relay at the 1954 European Aquatics Championships. The same year he won the national titles in the 400 m and 4×200 m freestyle events.

References

1931 births
Living people
Russian male freestyle swimmers
Soviet male freestyle swimmers
European Aquatics Championships medalists in swimming